Michael Mayer (born July 6, 2001) is an American football tight end. He played college football at Notre Dame, finishing as their all-time receptions leader at tight end with 180.

Early life and high school career
Mayer was born on July 6, 2001, in Independence, Kentucky. He attended Covington Catholic High School in Park Hills, Kentucky. As a senior in 2019, he was the Gatorade Kentucky Football Player of the Year after recording 49 receptions for 970 yards and 15 touchdowns. He was selected to play in the 2020 All-American Bowl. He committed to the University of Notre Dame to play college football.

College career
Mayer was Notre Dame's starting tight end as a freshman in 2020. In 2021, Mayer was named a third-team All-American. In 2022, he surpassed Tyler Eifert to become the school's all-time receptions leader at tight end with over 140 catches. He was named a consenus All-American, the first in program history since Ken MacAfee in 1976.

Personal life
Mayer is a Christian.

References

External links
 
 Notre Dame Fighting Irish bio

2001 births
Living people
All-American college football players
American football tight ends
Covington Catholic High School alumni
Notre Dame Fighting Irish football players
Players of American football from Kentucky